Jesús Francisco "Frankie" Gómez (born February 4, 1992) is an American former professional boxer. In 2010, Gómez signed with Oscar De La Hoya's company Golden Boy Promotions. Frankie was trained by five-time Trainer of the Year Freddie Roach.

Amateur career
Gomez began boxing as an 8-year old and had an outstanding amateur record of 120–8. In 2007 he took the Junior Olympic National Championship and Gold at the Cadet World Championships in Baku, Azerbaijan. Gómez won the U-17 2008 Cadet World Championships in the Light Welterweight division. In 2009 he became the U.S.A. Amateur National Champion at age 17 beating National Golden Gloves winner José Benavidez of Phoenix. At the 2009 World Amateur Boxing Championships he went on to win a silver medal after losing to Olympic bronze medalist Roniel Iglesias.

Professional career
Considered America's premiere amateur boxer when he turned Pro, Oscar De La Hoya said of Francisco "I've been watching his career closely for years, and Gómez is one of the best amateur boxers I've seen in a long time. He's (Gómez) a true blue chip prospect, and he has all the tools to become a world champion and a star in this game."

Gomez won his pro debut against veteran Clayvonne Howard by 3rd-round TKO. His third TKO victim was the Nigerian Akeem Akinbode, the fight took place on FSN's Fight Night Club.

In his first fight with trainer Abel Sanchez, Gómez beat the veteran Jason Davis by first round K.O.

In July 2011, Gomez beat Khadaphi Proctor; the bout was televised on TeleFutura.

In 2012, Gomez began training with famed boxing trainer Freddie Roach. After several victories, Gomez faced his biggest opponent yet in veteran Mauricio Herrera on the undercard of Canelo Álvarez vs. Amir Khan in May 2016. Gomez put on a dominant performance, winning all 10 rounds on all 3 judges' scorecards.

Inactivity

In July 2016, Freddie Roach told BoxingScene.com that he had not seen Gomez in the gym for two months. In January 2017, Roach stated that he had not seen Frankie Gomez since early fall of 2016. On February 28, 2018, the Twitter account for boxing podcast "The Boxing Guru" posted a picture of an overweight man purported to be Frankie Gomez. Gomez has not fought since 2016, and is listed as "inactive" on BoxRec.

Professional boxing record

|- style="margin:0.5em auto; font-size:95%;"
|align="center" colspan=8|21 Wins (13 knockouts), 0 Losses, 0 Draws
|- style="margin:0.5em auto; font-size:95%;"
|align=center style="border-style: none none solid solid; background: #e3e3e3"|Res.
|align=center style="border-style: none none solid solid; background: #e3e3e3"|Record
|align=center style="border-style: none none solid solid; background: #e3e3e3"|Opponent
|align=center style="border-style: none none solid solid; background: #e3e3e3"|Type
|align=center style="border-style: none none solid solid; background: #e3e3e3"|Rd., Time
|align=center style="border-style: none none solid solid; background: #e3e3e3"|Date
|align=center style="border-style: none none solid solid; background: #e3e3e3"|Location
|align=center style="border-style: none none solid solid; background: #e3e3e3"|Notes
|- align=center
|Win || 21-0-0 ||align=left| Mauricio Herrera
|
|
|
|align=left|
|align=left|
|- align=center
|Win || 20-0-0 ||align=left| Silverio Ortiz
|
|
|
|align=left|
|align=left|
|- align=center
|Win || 19-0-0 ||align=left| Jorge Silva
|
|
|
|align=left|
|align=left|
|- align=center
|Win || 18-0-0 ||align=left| Vernon Paris
|
|
|
|align=left|
|align=left|
|-align=center
|Win || 17-0-0 ||align=left| Orlando Vazquez
|
|
|
|align=left|
|align=left|
|-align=center
|Win || 16-0-0 ||align=left| Prince Doku Jr.
|
|
|
|align=left|
|align=left|
|-align=center
|-align=center
|Win || 15-0-0 ||align=left| Lanard Lane
|
|
|
|align=left|
|align=left|
|-align=center
|Win || 14-0-0 ||align=left| Pavel Miranda
|
|
|
|align=left|
|align=left|
|-align=center
|Win || 13-0-0 ||align=left| Manuel Leyva
|
|
|
|align=left|
|align=left|
|-align=center
|Win || 12-0-0 ||align=left| James Hope
|
|
|
|align=left|
|align=left|
|-align=center
|Win || 11-0-0 ||align=left| Adrían Granados	
| || 8 ||  || align=left|
|align=left|
|-align=center
|Win || 10-0-0 ||align=left| Khadaphi Proctor
| ||  ||  || align=left|
|align=left|
|-align=center
|Win || 9-0-0 ||align=left| Jason Davis
| ||  ||  || align=left|
|align=left|
|-align=center
|Win || 8-0-0 ||align=left| Jose Alfredo Lugo		
| || 6 ||  || align=left|
|align=left|
|-align=center
|Win || 7-0-0 ||align=left| Ramón Montaño
| || 6  ||  || align=left|
|align=left|
|-align=center
|Win || 6-0-0 ||align=left| Ricardo Calzada
| ||  ||  || align=left|
|align=left|
|-align=center
|Win || 5-0-0 ||align=left| Ronnie Peterson
| ||  ||  || align=left|
|align=left|
|-align=center
|Win || 4-0-0 ||align=left| Jaime Orrantia
| ||  ||  || align=left|
|align=left|
|-align=center
|Win || 3-0-0 ||align=left| Akeem Akinbode 
|  ||  ||  || align=left|
|align=left|
|-align=center
|Win || 2-0-0 || align=left| Ricardo Malfavon
| ||  ||  || align=left|
|align=left|
|-align=center
|Win || 1-0-0 || align=left| Clayvonne Howard
| ||  ||  || align=left|
|align=left|
|-align=center

References

External links

American boxers of Mexican descent
Sportspeople from Los Angeles County, California
Boxers from California
Light-welterweight boxers
Winners of the United States Championship for amateur boxers
1992 births
Living people
American male boxers
AIBA World Boxing Championships medalists
People from East Los Angeles, California